Tribble is an unincorporated community in Mason County, West Virginia, United States. Its post office closed in 1941.

References 

Unincorporated communities in West Virginia
Unincorporated communities in Mason County, West Virginia